Dong Guang Xinwen Tai (Chinese: 东广新闻台 (dong guang xin wen tai) [tʊŋ kwaŋ ɕin wən tʰaj]), whose full callsign is Dong Guang News Radio of Shanghai People's Radio Station (Chinese: 上海人民广播电台东广新闻资讯广播 (shang hai ren min guang bo dian tai dong guang xin wen zi xun guang bo) [ʂaŋ xaj ʐən min kwaŋ pwɔ tjɛn tʰaj tʊŋ kwaŋ ɕin wən tsɨ ɕyn kwaŋ pwɔ]), is a news radio channel in Shanghai in the People's Republic of China, broadcasting at both 90.9 FM and 1296 AM.

The radio channel is part of the Shanghai Media Group, affiliated to SMG Radio Centre.

There is a word "Dong Guang"(Chinese: 东广), which refers to the former Shanghai East Radio Company) in its callsign, but actually the channel was founded by former Shanghai People's Radio Station, not Shanghai East Radio Company in 2007.

External links
 FM 90.9 Official website

Radio stations in China
Shanghai Media Group